The MANDLI are a Muslim Rajput community found in the state of Gujarat in India.

The Mandali claim to have migrated in the 16th Century and settled at Mandal, a small town of Viramgam taluka of Ahmadabad District. Thus, the community is named after its place of residence. A further migration took place in the 19th Century, when a few members of the community moved to Surat.

Present circumstances
The Mandli community is now mainly distributed in the town of Mandal, Viramgam, Dist. Ahmedabd Kadi Dist.Mehsana, Juhapura localities of Ahmedabad and Dhangadhra of Surendra Nagar District. They are further divided into a number of clans, the main ones being the Kachot, Salar, Kaji, Patadiya, Waria, Barejiya, Adi, Maccu, Jariya and Phangaat. All these clans are of equal status, and inter marry. Although the same surnames can be found in other castes too (majorly 'Sunni') some of them come under Mandli mainly due to the regional causes rather than ancestral. The Mandli are a community of marginal landowners, although significant numbers are now found in the cities of Ahmedabad and Surat. Like other Gujarati Muslims, they have a caste association known as the Mandli Muslim Jamaat. The community mainly are Sunni and deovbandi.

See also

Molesalam Rajputs
Muslim Nayaks

References

Social groups of Gujarat
Muslim communities of India
Muslim communities of Gujarat
Rajput clans of Gujarat